Vulgar (stylized in all caps) is the fourth studio album by Japanese heavy metal band Dir En Grey released on September 10, 2003 in Japan and on February 21, 2006 in Europe. A limited edition containing an additional DVD was also released. It featured the video of the song "Obscure", albeit a censored version. Vulgar is the first Dir En Grey release not to feature individual credits for the music, though the preceding singles featured individual credits.

Track listing

Personnel
Dir En Grey
Kyo - Vocals, lyricist
Die - Guitar, composer
Kaoru - Guitar, composer
Toshiya - Bass guitar, composer
Shinya - Drums, composer

Notes
 "蝕紅" offers several ways of romanization, namely "Shokubeni"  and "Syokubeni" (a variation utilizing Kunrei-shiki romanization). "Syokubeni" was once used on Dir En Grey's official site, although mention in most other media (including release booklets) the Hepburn romanization style is used, giving the title as "Shokubeni".
 A re-recording of "Shokubeni" appears as a b-side on their 2009 single "Hageshisa to, Kono Mune no Naka de Karamitsuita Shakunetsu no Yami", recorded only in one take.
 A re-recording of "Obscure" appears as a b-side on their 2011 single "Lotus".
 A re-recording of "Kasumi" appears on their 2013 mini-album The Unraveling.
 A re-recording of "The IIID Empire" appears on their 2018 "best of" compilation Vestige of Scratches.

References

2003 albums
Dir En Grey albums